Dai shogi (大将棋, 'large chess') or Kamakura dai shogi (鎌倉大将棋) is a chess variant native to Japan. It derived from Heian era shogi, and is similar to standard shogi (sometimes called Japanese chess) in its rules and game play. Dai shogi is only one of several large board shogi variants. Its name means large shogi, from a time when there were three sizes of shogi games. Early versions of dai shogi can be traced back to the Kamakura period, from about AD 1230. It was the historical basis for the later, much more popular variant chu shogi.

Rules of the game 

Other than the additional pieces (the iron and stone generals, knights, angry boars, cat swords, evil wolves, violent oxen, and flying dragons, which all promote to gold generals), the rules of dai shogi are thought to have corresponded very closely to those of its descendant chu shogi.

Objective 

The objective of the game is to capture the opponent's king and, if present, the prince, which counts as a second king; or to capture all the other pieces, leaving a bare king or bare prince.  Unlike standard shogi, pieces may not be dropped back into play after capture.

Game play 

Two players alternate, making a move with Black moving first. (The pieces are not differentiated by color; the traditional chess terms "Black" and "White" are only used to indicate who plays first, and to differentiate the sides during discussions of the game.) A move consists of moving a piece either to an empty square on the board or to a square occupied by an opposing piece, thus capturing that piece; and optionally of promoting the moving piece, if the move enters the promotion zone, or if it is a capture and any part of it is in the promotion zone.

Game equipment 

Two players, Black and White (or 先手 sente and 後手 gote), play on a board ruled into a grid of 15 ranks (rows) and 15 files (columns) with a total of 225 squares.  The squares are undifferentiated by marking or color, unlike a Western chess board.

Each player has a set of 65 pieces of 29 different types.  In all, a player must remember 36 different moves.  Each piece has its name written on it in Japanese  kanji. The writing is typically in black. On the reverse side of most pieces there are characters to indicate the piece's promoted rank, typically written in red. The pieces are wedge-shaped and their orientation indicates which player they belong to, as they point toward the opposing side. The pieces are of slightly different sizes, from largest to smallest (most to least powerful) they are:

 1 King
 1 Queen
 1 Lion
 2 Dragon kings
 2 Dragon horses
 2 Rooks
 2 Bishops
 1 Kirin
 1 Phoenix
 2 Violent oxen
 2 Flying dragons
 1 Drunk elephant
 2 Blind tigers
 2 Ferocious leopards
 2 Gold generals
 2 Silver generals
 2 Copper generals
 2 Angry boars
 2 Cat swords
 2 Vertical movers
 2 Side movers
 2 Reverse Chariots
 2 Lances
 2 Knights
 2 Evil wolves
 2 Iron generals
 2 Stone generals
 2 Gobetweens
 15 Pawns

Listed below are the pieces of the game and, if they promote, the pieces they promote to. Names are rough translations that have become somewhat standardized in English. Pieces are listed alphabetically by their English name. (Sometimes the queen is called the "free king", a direct translation of its Japanese name. The kirin's name is sometimes anglicised as kylin.)

The promotions apply only to pieces which start out with the ranks in the left-most column, that is, pieces with these ranks written in black; promoted pieces with those same ranks written in red may not promote further. Pieces which only appear upon promotion, that is, names which only occur written in red, are marked with an asterisk. The king, queen, and lion do not promote.

1 The pronunciations of 龍馬, 奔王, 反車, and 白駒 are irregular. The regular forms ryūme, hon'ō, hansha, and hakuku are also seen.

Setup 

Below is a diagram showing the initial setup of the board.

The queen could also be abbreviated FK (for free king) and the kirin as Ky (for kylin).

Movement and capture 

An opposing piece is captured by displacement: That is, if a piece moves to a square occupied by an opposing piece, the opposing piece is displaced and removed from the board. A piece cannot move to a square occupied by a friendly piece, that is, by another piece controlled by the moving player.

Each piece on the game moves in a characteristic pattern. Pieces move either orthogonally (that is, forward, backward, left, or right, in the direction of one of the arms of a plus sign, +), or diagonally (in the direction of one of the arms of a multiplication sign, ×). The lion and knight are exceptions in that they do not move, or are not required to move, in a straight line.

Many pieces are capable of several kinds of movement, with the type of movement most often depending on the direction in which they move. The movement categories are:

Step movers

Some pieces move only one square at a time. If a friendly piece occupies an adjacent square, the moving piece may not move in that direction; if an opposing piece is there, it may be displaced and captured.

The step movers are the king, drunk elephant, blind tiger, ferocious leopard, generals, angry boar, cat sword, evil wolf, go between and the 15 pawns on each side.

Limited ranging pieces

The violent ox and flying dragon can move along a limited number (2) of free (empty) squares along a straight line in certain directions. Other than the limited distance, they move like ranging pieces. See below.

Jumping pieces

Several pieces can jump, that is, they can pass over any intervening piece, whether friend or foe, with no effect on either. These are the lion, kirin, phoenix and knight.

Ranging pieces

Many pieces can move any number of empty squares along a straight orthogonal or diagonal line, limited only by the edge of the board. If an opposing piece intervenes, it may be captured by moving to that square and removing it from the board. A ranging piece must stop where it captures, and cannot bypass a piece that is in its way. If a friendly piece intervenes, the moving piece is limited to a distance that stops short of the intervening piece; if the friendly piece is adjacent, it cannot move in that direction at all.

The ranging pieces are the queen, dragon king, dragon horse, rook, bishop, vertical mover, side mover, reverse chariot and lance. Only the queen can range along all eight directions.

Lion moves (multiple captures)

The lion has sequential multiple-capture ability, called a 'lion move', as do the soaring eagle and horned falcon (promoted dragon king and dragon horse) to a lesser extent.  The details of these powerful moves are described for the lion below.

Promotion 

The promotion zone is the 'enemy camp', the farthest five ranks of the board, which are mostly occupied by the opposing player's pieces when the board is first set up.  When a promotable piece makes a move entering the promotion zone, or makes a capture within the promotion zone—including moves entering, leaving, or moving entirely within the zone—it has the option of "promoting" to a more powerful rank. Promotion is effected by turning the piece over after it moves, revealing the name of its promoted rank.  Promotion is not mandatory, and in some cases it may be beneficial to leave the piece unpromoted.  Promotion is permanent and promoted pieces may not revert to their original rank.

If a piece is not promoted upon entering the promotion zone, then it may only promote if it makes a capture. This is reset by leaving the zone and reentering: promotion is possible on such a reentry even without a capture.

Promoting a piece has the effect of changing how that piece moves. See below.

If a piece that cannot retreat or move aside advances across the board until it reaches the other side, it is trapped. This applies to the pawn, stone general, iron general, knight, and lance. This would hardly occur in practice, because all of these but the knight promote to pieces that keep their old moves, and stalemate is a loss for the stalemated player.  The situation of the knight is unclear, as it promotes to a piece that does not keep its old moves, and thus there could be a reason to defer its promotion. In chu shogi, which is descended from dai shogi, this situation applies to the pawn, which therefore gets a second chance to promote at the last rank on a non-capture: this second chance can likewise be declined, leaving the pawn as an immobile "dead piece" (死に駒). Whether this rule applies to the knight in dai shogi is uncertain, both because this rule might be a later refinement to chu shogi, and because the Edo-era sources have numerous lacunae when describing the rules of the variants other than sho shogi and chu shogi.

The promotion rules of dai shogi may have changed significantly over time. The promotion rules in the earlier Heian shogi and Heian dai shogi provide for all weak stepping pieces to promote to the gold general, which is true for sho shogi and modern shogi. However, in chu shogi many of these pieces have changed promotions to ranging pieces in the initial setup. Dai shogi has a mixture of these rules: the weak steppers or limited rangers unique to dai shogi all promote to the gold general, but those present in chu shogi keep their promotion from the latter game. It is likely that these differing promotions in chu shogi are a later historical innovation, that was later copied back into dai shogi when chu shogi became more popular than dai shogi.

Individual pieces

Following are diagrams that indicate the movement of each piece.  Pieces are listed roughly in order, from front to back rows, with pieces making similar moves paired.  Pieces with a gray heading start out in the game; those with a blue heading only appear on the board as a promoted piece. Betza's funny notation has been included in brackets for easier reference, with the extension that the notation xxxayyyK stands for an xxxK move possibly followed by an yyyK move, not necessarily in the same direction. Larger numbers of 'legs' can be indicated by repeated application of 'a'. By default continuation legs can go into all directions, but can be restricted to a single line by a modifier 'v' ("vertical", interpreted relative to the piece's current position on its path). The default modality of all legs is the ability to move and capture: other possibilities are specified explicitly. Square brackets are used to make it clear what operators the a modifier chains together: thus DaK would denote a dabbaba move followed by a king move, but D[aK] would denote a piece that can move as a dabbaba, or twice as a king.

Repetition 
A player may not make a move if the resulting position is one that has previously occurred in the game with the same player to move. This is called repetition (千日手 sennichite). Note that certain pieces have the ability to pass in certain situations (a lion, when at least one square immediately adjacent to it is unoccupied, a horned falcon, when the square immediately in front of it is unoccupied, and a soaring eagle, when one or both of the two squares immediately diagonally in front of it are unoccupied). Such a pass move leaves the position unchanged, but it does not violate the repetition rule, as it will now be the turn of the other player to move. Of course, two consecutive passes are not possible, as the first player will see the same position as before.

However, evidence from chu shogi problems suggests that this at least does not apply to a player who is in check or whose pieces are attacked, as otherwise one could win via perpetual check or perpetual pursuit. The modern chu shogi rule as applied by the Japanese Chu Shogi Association (JCSA) is as follows, and presumably dai shogi should be similar. If one side is making attacks on other pieces (however futile) with his moves in the repeat cycle, and the other is not, the attacking side must deviate, while in case of checking the checker must deviate regardless of whether the checked side attacks other pieces. In the case of consecutive passes, the side passing first must deviate, making turn passing to avoid zugzwang pointless if the opponent is in a position where he can pass his turn too. Only the fourth repetition is forbidden by these rules. If none of these are applicable, repetition is a draw.

Check and mate 

When a player makes a move such that the opponent's only remaining royal (king or prince) could be captured on the following move, the move is said to give check; the king or prince is said to be in check. If a player's king or prince is in check and no legal move by that player will get it out of check, the checking move is also mate, and effectively wins the game.

Unlike Western chess, a player need not move out of check in dai shogi, and indeed may even move into check. Although obviously not often a good idea, a player with more than one royal may occasionally sacrifice one of these pieces as part of a gambit.

Game end 

A player who captures the opponent's sole remaining king or prince wins the game. Thus a player who is checkmated or stalemated will lose. The very artificial situation of a smothered stalemate, where no moves are possible (even those that would expose the king), is not covered in the historical sources. The Chess Variant Pages rule this as a loss for the stalemated player, for definiteness.

In practice this rarely happens, as a player will resign when checkmated, as otherwise when loss is inevitable.

A player who makes an illegal move loses immediately. (This rule may be relaxed in casual games.)

Game notation 

The method used in English-language texts to express shogi moves was established by George Hodges in 1976. It is derived from the algebraic notation used for chess, but modifications have been made for dai shogi.

A typical example is P-8f.  The first letter represents the piece moved (see setup above).  Promoted pieces have a + added in front of the letter. e.g., +P for a gold general (promoted pawn).  The designation of the piece is followed by a symbol indicating the type of move: - for an ordinary move or x for a capture.
Next is the designation for the square on which the piece lands.  This consists of a number representing the file and a lowercase letter representing the rank, with 1a being the top right corner (as seen from Black's point of view) and 15o being the bottom left corner.  (This method of designating squares is based on Japanese convention, which, however, uses Japanese numerals instead of letters. For example, the square 2c is denoted by 2三 in Japanese.)

If a move entitles the player to promote the piece, then a + is added to the end to signify that the promotion was taken, or an = to indicate that it was declined. For example, Nx7d= indicates a knight capturing on 7d without promoting.

In cases where the above notation would be ambiguous, the designation of the start square is added after the designation for the piece in order to make clear which piece is meant.

When a 'Lion', 'Horned Falcon' or 'Soaring Eagle' captures by 'igui' (that is, without moving), the square of the piece being captured is used instead of the destination square, and this is preceded by the symbol '!'.  For example, a Lion on 8c capturing a piece on 9d would be shown as Lnx!9d.

When a piece makes a double capture with 'Lion' powers, both captures are shown in the order that they were made. For example, a Lion on 3g, capturing a piece on 3h and then capturing another on 2i, would be represented by Lnx3hx2i.

Moves are commonly numbered as in chess.

See also 
 Chu shogi
 Dai dai shogi
 Heian dai shogi
 History of shogi
 Maka dai dai shogi
 Shogi variant
 Tai shogi
 Taikyoku shogi
 Tenjiku shogi
 Wa shogi

External links 
 Dai Shogi at The Chess Variant Pages
 Shogi.net/Dai Shogi
 Dai shogi games with problems etc.
 Richard's Play-by-eMail Server - Play Dai Shogi via web page or email your commands to the server, with email notifications when moves have been made in the game you're playing.
 HaChu AI by H. G. Muller - Play dai shogi (or a few other variants) against your own computer

Shogi variants